Sarracenia × swaniana is a nothospecies of carnivorous plant from the genus Sarracenia in the family Sarraceniaceae described by hort. and Nichols. It is a hybrid between Sarracenia purpurea subsp. venosa and Sarracenia minor var. minor.

References 

swaniana
Hybrid plants